The People's Services Party (PSP; sometimes translated as the Peoples' Development Services Party, PDSP) is a political party in Vanuatu.

History
In the 2012 general elections the party nominated three candidates, receiving 0.8% of the vote and winning one seat; Don Ken in Malekula.

In the 2016 elections the party fielded three candidates again, with Ken re-elected in Malekula.

References

Political parties in Vanuatu